DJ Rekha (born Rekha Malhotra, 1971) is a London-born musician, DJ, producer, curator, activist.  She has been credited with pioneering Bhangra music in North America. Her first album, DJ Rekha Presents Basement Bhangra, released in October 2007 on Koch Records, fuses the Indian genre of bhangra music with international hip-hop and drum beats.

Early life 
DJ Rekha spent the first year of her life in London, and the following three years in New Delhi, India. She credits this time in India as critical for exposure to Punjabi, the primary language of bhangra. She returned to London briefly until her family moved to Queens, New York. DJ Rekha spent most of her adolescence in Westbury, Long Island and currently lives in Jackson Heights, Queens. She graduated from Queens College with a degree in Urban Studies while simultaneously experimenting and honing her craft on the turntables.

Music 

DJ Rekha launched a monthly event known as Basement Bhangra at SOB's on Varick Street. From 1997 - 2017, Basement Bhangra popularized the traditional-modern bhangra blend, making the genre a part of the NYC club scene. The final 20th anniversary show was held at Central Park's Summerstage on August 6, 2017.

DJ Rekha has brought South Asian music to New York by spinning at events like P.S. 1's Warm Up Series, Central Park's Summerstage, Prospect Park’s Celebrate Brooklyn, Brooklyn Museum's First Saturdays, and the annual flagship Loving Day celebration held in New York City. She arranged the music for Bridge and Tunnel, the [Tony Award] winning Off-Broadway show. Newsweek recognized her as one of the most influential South Asians in the US, and she has received accolades from The New York Times, CNN, The Fader, The Village Voice, and The Washington Post, among others.

Her debut album, DJ Rekha Presents Basement Bhangra, is a 17 track mix CD with four exclusive tracks including two original productions from Rekha. In this album, DJ Rekha collaborated with  Wyclef Jean, Panjabi MC, and Bikram Singh, among others.  The album weaves Punjabi folk traditions, dance hall rhythms from the U.S., U.K. and Jamaica, and DJ techniques that are 100% New York.

Since 2010, DJ Rekha has hosted 'Bhangra and Beyond', a weekly radio show on BTRtoday.

Equipment
 Turntable
 Roland SP-808 sampler

Entrepreneur 
In 2000, DJ Rekha founded Sangament (sangam is Hindi for "confluence" — a place where two rivers flow together), a production company that produces live concerts and provides music consulting services to record labels, cultural institutions, media companies, and corporations. DJ Rekha produces live events and her monthly parties, Basement Bhangra and Bollywood Disco through Sangament, Inc.

DJ Rekha founded Basement Bhangra in 1997 in New York. It occurred on the first Thursday of every month and became an international phenomenon, drawing an extremely diverse audience. It started with dance lessons and then turned into a dance party. It received international press, being featured on the cover of Billboard magazine and in Dutch and Japanese television.

References

Further reading

External links

1971 births
DJs from London
Club DJs
Women DJs
Living people
People from Westbury, New York
English women in electronic music
Electronic dance music DJs
21st-century English women musicians